Acanthurus tristis is a tang from the Indian Ocean. It occasionally makes its way into the aquarium trade. It grows to a length of 25 cm.

References

Acanthurus
Fish described in 1993